Ian David Clark (born 23 October 1974) is an English former professional footballer who made nearly 300 appearances in the Football League playing for Doncaster Rovers, Hartlepool United and Darlington. He also played in the Conference for Scarborough and at other levels of non-League football for Stockton, Harrogate Town, Gateshead, Spennymoor United, Norton & Stockton Ancients, Horden Colliery Welfare, Guisborough Town and Thornaby.

References

1974 births
Living people
Footballers from Stockton-on-Tees
Footballers from County Durham
English footballers
Association football midfielders
Association football utility players
Thornaby F.C. players
Doncaster Rovers F.C. players
Hartlepool United F.C. players
Darlington F.C. players
Scarborough F.C. players
Harrogate Town A.F.C. players
Gateshead F.C. players
Spennymoor United F.C. players
Norton & Stockton Ancients F.C. players
Darlington Town F.C. players
Guisborough Town F.C. players
English Football League players
National League (English football) players
Northern Premier League players
Northern Football League players